Progress M-2, was a Soviet uncrewed cargo spacecraft which was launched in 1989 to resupply the Mir space station. The nineteenth of sixty four Progress spacecraft to visit Mir, it used the Progress-M 11F615A55 configuration, and had the serial number 202. It carried supplies including food, water and oxygen for the EO-5 crew aboard Mir, as well as equipment for conducting scientific research, and fuel for adjusting the station's orbit and performing manoeuvres.

Progress M-2 was launched at 03:30:50 GMT on 20 December 1989, atop a Soyuz-U2 carrier rocket flying from Site 1/5 at the Baikonur Cosmodrome. It docked with the aft port of the Kvant-1 module of Mir at 05:41:21 GMT on 22 December. Progress M-2 remained docked with Mir for forty eight days before undocking at 02:33:07 GMT on 9 February 1990 to make way for the Soyuz TM-9 spacecraft, carrying the EO-6 crew to the station.

Progress M-2 was deorbited at 07:07:00 GMT, a few hours after it had undocked. It burned up in the atmosphere over the Pacific Ocean, with any remaining debris landing in the ocean at around 07:56 GMT.

See also

1989 in spaceflight
1990 in spaceflight
List of Progress flights
List of uncrewed spaceflights to Mir

References

1989 in the Soviet Union
1990 in spaceflight
Progress (spacecraft) missions
Spacecraft launched in 1989